Buccinum mirandum is a species of sea snail, a marine gastropod mollusk in the family Buccinidae, the true whelks.

There are two subspecies :
 Buccinum mirandum mirandum Smith, 1875
 Buccinum mirandum picturatum Dall, 1887

Description
The shell grows to a length of 45 mm. It is white with a creamy or brownish tint and is covered with rusty brown spots. The body whorl has five, hardy perceptible spiral ribs, with the upper one somewhat nodose. The surface is puckered below the suture. The surface has a fine sculpture with minute spiral lines mingled with coarser lines. The aperture is ovate and oblong and its interior is brownish ochraceous. The outer lip is white.

Distribution
This marine species is distributed in the Pacific Ocean along Japan, Korea and the Kuril Islands

References

External links
 

Buccinidae
Gastropods described in 1875